Parcheh Balut (also Romanized as Pārcheh Balūţ; also known as Balū and Pācheh Balūţ) is a village in Kakavand-e Sharqi Rural District, Kakavand District, Delfan County, Lorestan Province, Iran. At the 2006 census, its population was 133, in 26 families.

References 

Towns and villages in Delfan County